Solomon Porter Hood (July 30, 18531943) the United States Minister to Liberia from 1921 to 1926.

Early life
Hood was born on July 30, 1853, in Lancaster, Pennsylvania to parents Lewis Price and Matilda Catharine Hood.

Diplomatic career
Hood was appointed by President Warren G. Harding to the position of United States Minister to Liberia on October 26, 1921. The presentation of his credentials occurred on February 13, 1922. He remained in this position until January 9, 1926. Hood also served as the United States Consul General to Monrovia from 1922 to 1924.

Personal life
Hood married Mary Anna Davis in 1884. Hood was a member of the African Methodist Episcopal Church. Hood was a member of the Odd Fellows and the Elks.

Death
Hood died in 1943 in Atlantic Highlands, New Jersey. Hood was interred at the Crystal Stream Cemetery in Locust, New Jersey.

References

1853 births
1943 deaths
New Jersey Republicans
Ambassadors of the United States to Liberia
African-American diplomats
Burials in New Jersey
20th-century American diplomats
American consuls
African-American Methodists
19th-century African-American people
20th-century African-American people
People from Lancaster, Pennsylvania